The 24 Heures Motos (often called in English the 24 Hours of Le Mans motorcycle race) is a motorcycle endurance race held annually since 1978 on the Bugatti Circuit, Le Mans, Sarthe, France. The race is organized by the Automobile Club de l'Ouest (ACO) and is part of the Endurance FIM World Championship.

History
When the Bol d'Or moved from Bugatti Circuit to Circuit Paul Ricard at the end of 1977, the ACO created the 24 Heures Moto. The race became one of "the classics" of endurance racing along with the 24 Hours of Liège, the 8 Hours Of Suzuka, and the Bol d'Or.

At the end of 2001, the three 24 Hour classic races (Le Mans, Liège and the Bol d'Or) withdrew from the Endurance World Championship to create the Master of Endurance. Le Mans returned to the Endurance FIM World Championship in 2006.

Race weekend format
Thursday
Free practice sessions, 1st qualifying practice sessions (in groups) and night practice sessions
Friday
2nd qualifying practice sessions (in groups), superpole
Saturday
Warm-up session.  3.00 PM Le Mans start.  
NOTE:  The traditional Le Mans start, abolished in 1970 for automobiles, is still used for motorcycles.
Sunday
3.00 pm, finish of the race followed by the prize-giving ceremony

Winners

By manufacturer

See also
FIM Endurance World Championship

References

External links
 Official website

Motorcycle races
Motorsport competitions in France
Endurance motor racing
Sport in Le Mans